Ocean Beach may refer to a number of beaches:

Places 

 Australia
 Ocean Beach (Tasmania)
 Ocean Beach (Western Australia)

 New Zealand
 Ocean Beach (Bluff Harbour), Southland
 Ocean Beach, Hawke's Bay, near Havelock North
 Ocean Beach, Northland, near Whangarei
 Ocean Beach, Otago, in Dunedin
 Ocean Beach, Wellington, on Palliser Bay

 United States
 Ocean Beach, San Diego, California, also community
 Ocean Beach, San Francisco, California
 Ocean Beach (New London), Connecticut
 Ocean Beach, Monmouth County, New Jersey
 Ocean Beach, Ocean County, New Jersey
 Ocean Beach, New York, a village

Other 

 Ocean Beach (album), by the Red House Painters